Camps Bay (Afrikaans: Kampsbaai) is an affluent suburb of Cape Town, South Africa, and the small bay on the west coast of the Cape Peninsula after which it is named. In summer it attracts many South African and foreign visitors.

History

The first residents of Camps Bay were the San (Hunter Gatherers) and the Goringqhaique, Khoi pastorates. When Jan van Riebeek established a refreshment station for the VOC (Dutch East India Company), the Twelve Apostles were covered in forests with lion, leopard and antelope.

In competition with the more recent settlers, the Gringqhaique lost their grazing lands on the south east slopes of Table Mountain and in 1657 were restricted to Camps Bay.

By 1713 the number of Gringqhaique population had been reduced by measles and smallpox. All that was left of their settlement was an old kraal (Oudekraal).

The area was then granted to John Lodewyk Wernich and passed from father to son. Johan Wernich married Anna Koekemoer, who on his death in 1778, married Fredrick Ernst von Kamptz, a sailor and the area became known as “Die Baai van von Kamptz”.

For most of the 1800s Camps Bay was undeveloped. Lord Charles Somerset used the area for hunting and used the Roundhouse as his lodge. Kloof Nek Road was built in 1848 and in 1884 Thomas Bain was commissioned to build a road from Sea Point to Camps Bay using convict labour.

The road was completed in 1887 and named Victoria road to honour Queen Victoria’s jubilee in 1888. The road allowed people to cycle out to Camps Bay which had gained popularity as a picnic site. This led to the development, in 1901 of the Camps Bay tramway to bring people out for the day and with it the development of the tidal pools, the Rotunda (now the Bay Hotel) and a pavilion for concerts and shows.

In 1913 Camps Bay was incorporated into Cape Town although it was still seen as a recreational area rather than a residential area.

Beaches

Oudekraal is made up of a collection of tiny beaches sheltered amongst the boulders and a well established picnic area with lawns, Braais, covered seating areas with tables, benches and public toilets.

Lui Bay (also known as Witsand) is a popular dive site. In 1977 two scrap vessels, the Antipolis and Romelia, were being towed around the cape when their tow line broke in a storm. This caused the Antipolis to run aground near Oudekraal, while the Romelia foundered further south between Llandudno and Sandy Bay. The hull of the Antipolis is now visible at low tide.

Koeël Bay has an African open-air curio market that sells hand crafted items from all over Africa.

Bakoven gets its name because of a large rock just off-shore with what appears as an oven door in its side. There are several sheltered coves located in Bakoven. There is a sea rescue base stationed here and a popular swimming beach is off Beta Close.  In the early 1940s a row of beach front houses were erected to house honored members of the South African Army who fought during World War II.  Many of these old houses still stand and are now registered as South African National Heritage Sites.

Balie Bay, from the Afrikaans kak balie (shit barrel) after the sewer discharge that used to be there.

Camps Bay Beach, a Blue Flag Beach since 2008, is the largest white sand beach in Camps Bay. There is a seasonal life guard station with toilets at the west end of the beach. The beach is opposite Camps Bay's main tourist hub, featuring multiple hotels, restaurants, and shops.

Glen Beach, at the far right of Camps Bay beach, is known as Camps Bay's best surfing beach. Short, fast rides and a small take-off area makes Glen Beach one of the hardest of Cape Town's beach breaks to surf and has resulted in a strong local atmosphere.

In popular culture
 Camps Bay was used as the scene of the virtual 'perfect' town San Junipero in the episode of the same name in season 3 of Black Mirror. Additionally, Apple’s Watch Series 4 advertisement features multiple parts of Cape Town including Camps Bay.
 Camps Bay was the home of the worldwide Television series SAF3, starring Dolph Lundgren. The series was created by Gregory J. Bonann, the creator of the world famous series BAYWATCH. SAF3's set was on the main beach. The stunning beaches of Camps Bay were the stunning backdrop of all 20 episodes.

Notable residents
 Anthony Oliphant (17 November 1793 – 9 March 1859), attorney general and King's Advocate in the Vice-Admiralty Court from 1827 to circa. 1838.
 Anton Fig (born 8 August 1952), session drummer.
 Audrey Blignault (6 July 1916 – 1 October 2008), author.
 Ben Dekker (born 1940), was briefly superintendent at Stans Halt Youth Hostel in the Big Glen.
 Ben Turok (26 June 1927 – 9 December 2019), former anti-apartheid activist, economics professor and former MP.
 David Kramer (born 27 June 1951), singer, songwriter, playwright and director, born in Worcester now lives in Camps Bay.
 Dean Furman (born 1988), professional footballer.
 Elsie Garrett Rice (25 November 1869 - 27 April 1959), botanical artist.
 Gonda Betrix (born 1943), Springbok equestrian.
 Grant Haskin (born 1968), Cape Town City Councillor and previously Deputy Mayor of Cape Town.
 Herschelle Gibbs (born 23 February 1974), cricketer.
 James Small (10 February 1969 – 10 July 2019), Springbok rugby player.
 Jannie Engelbrecht (born 10 November 1938), Springbok rugby player, from Stellenbosch but lived in Camps Bay.
 John Whitmore (30 March 1929 – 24 December 2001), pioneered the sport of surfing in South Africa.
 Jordy Smith (born 11 February 1988), professional surfer
 Kyle Brown (born 6 February 1987), rugby union player.
 Lewis Pugh (born 5 December 1969), endurance swimmer and ocean advocate.
 Lord Charles Somerset (12 December 1767 – 18 February 1831), governor of the Cape Colony from 1814 to 1826.
 Lyndall Jarvis, model and television presenter.
 Mary Renault (4 September 1905 – 13 December 1983), writer.
 Nigel Hawthorne (5 April 1929 – 26 December 2001), actor.
 Paige Nick, novelist, columnist and advertising copywriter.
 Percy Montgomery (born 15 March 1974), retired rugby union player.
 Pieter Toerien  (born 1942) producer and theatre manager.
 Simon Thirsk (born 15 May 1977) retired Olympic swimmer.
 Stelio Savante (born 24 April 1970), actor.
 Zainunnisa Gool (6 November 1897 – 1 July 1963), anti-apartheid political and civil rights leader.

See also
 Beaches of Cape Town

References

Further reading 
 Camps Bay: An Illustrated History by Gwynne Schrire, Gwynne Schrire Robins, Tricolor Press, 2003, 
 Report of the Select Committee on the Petition of Jacob Lurie, Cape Town, Cape Times Ltd., Government Printers, 1909
 Tavern of the Seas by Lawrence G. Green, 1947, Chapter Fourteen - Atlantic Coast 
 The Lion Mountain and the story of Bantry Bay, Clifton and Camps Bay on the Atlantic Coast of the Cape Peninsula by Mona de Beer, 
 To Live This Poor Life': Remembering the Hottentots Huisie Squatter Fishery, Cape Town, c. 1934-c. 1965 by Lance van Sittert, Social History, Vol. 26, No. 1 (Jan., 2001), pp. 1–21

External links

Suburbs of Cape Town